Diamond or Diamond City is located at the junction of Moose Creek and Bearpaw River,  east of Chilchukabena Lake in Denali Borough, Alaska. Diamond was established c. 1905 as a mining camp at the head of small-boat navigation on the Bearpaw River. It had a post office in 1906 and then again from 1929 until 1951. Diamond is now abandoned.

References

Mining communities in Alaska